William Telfer Campbell  (1863 - 1929), born in India, was the second Resident Commissioner of the Gilbert and Ellice Islands protectorate, from 1895 to 1909.

Campbell had started his career in the Royal Irish Constabulary. He was twice the subject of official enquiries into high-handedness, brutality, and the use of forced labour. In 1901 complaints began to reach the United Kingdom of misgovernment in the Gilbert Islands.

The conduct of Campbell was criticised as to his legislative, judicial and administrative management (including allegations of forced labour exacted from islanders) and became the subject of the 1909 report by Arthur Mahaffy. In 1913, an anonymous correspondent to The New Age newspaper described the maladministration of W. Telfer Campbell and questioned the partiality of Arthur Mahaffy, because he was a former colonial official in the Gilberts. The anonymous correspondent, probably John Quayle-Dickson, also criticised the operations of the Pacific Phosphate Company on Ocean Island.

He was then British consul in Tonga from 1909 to 1913. After been "withdrawn from service in the Pacific", he became Colonial Secretary of the Colony of The Gambia.

Further reading
Fragments of Empire: A History of the Western Pacific High Commission 1877-1914, by Deryck Scarr, published by C. Hurst & Co., 1967.
Winding Up the British Empire in the Pacific Islands, by W. David McIntyre, published by the Oxford University Press, 2014.

References

1863 births
1929 deaths
Governors of the Gilbert and Ellice Islands
British colonial governors and administrators in Oceania